Where the Lighthouse Flashes (Swedish: Där fyren blinkar) is a 1924 Swedish silent drama film directed by Ivar Kåge and starring Gösta Hillberg, Ester Julin and Edvin Adolphson. It was shot at the Råsunda Studios in Stockholm. The film's sets were designed by the art director Vilhelm Bryde.

Cast
 Gösta Hillberg as 	Lang
 Ester Julin as Mrs. Lang
 Svea Frisch-Kåge as 	Marja
 Edvin Adolphson as 	Fritiof
 Ivar Kåge as 	Rickhard Henning
 Manne Göthson as 	Lundgren
 Magda Holm as 	Blenda
 Nicke Liedfeld as 	Kruuse
 Josua Bengtson as 	Napoleon Roos
 Tore Lindwall as 	Bertil Roos, the son
 Albert Eriksson as 	Nisse
 Sven Hasselström as 	Captain Davidsson
 Tom Walter as Boy
 Torsten Winge as 	Principal Speaker
 Olle Åhlund as 	Kicke

References

Bibliography
 Larsson, Mariah & Marklund, Anders. Swedish Film: An Introduction and Reader. Nordic Academic Press, 2010.

External links

1924 films
1924 drama films
Swedish drama films
Swedish silent feature films
Swedish black-and-white films
1920s Swedish-language films
Silent drama films
1920s Swedish films